A todo corazón is a Venezuelan drama telenovela created by Laura Visconti and written by César Sierra and Ana Teresa Sosa for Venevisión. The series follows the life and problems facing young high school students. This telenovela marked the debut of Gaby Espino, Adrián Delgado, Lourdes Martínez and Juan Alfonso Baptista. In 2015 Televen made the remake of the telenovela, titled A puro corazón, which had nothing more to do with Adrián Delgado as Cristóbal Ortega.

Plot 
The series tells the adventures and misadventures in the life of some adolescents of secondary. Everything happens in a private school, the street, their respective homes, the soda fountain and other meeting points. Although the plot usually focuses on its protagonists, Adrián (Adrián Delgado) and Patricia (Lourdes Martínez). Where Patricia lives eternally in love with Adrián, but he unexpectedly falls in love with Natalia (Gabriela Espino), a rich girl who arrives at the school in the last year.

Cast 
 Adrián Delgado as Adrián Rodríguez
 Lourdes Martínez as Patricia Gutiérrez
 Gabriela Espino as Natalia Aristeguieta
 Juan Alfonso Baptista as Elías Mujica / El Gato
 Betty Cabrera as Jessica Iturriza
 Yessi Gravano as Lorena Sánchez
 Mónica López as Carlota Torres Aristigueta
 Lissange Belisario as Claudia Pérez
 Yerling Hostos as Coraima López
 Zywia Castrillo as Laura Palmero
 Víctor Hugo Gómes as Leonardo Ramón Gutiérrez
 Roger Teixeira as Tony Castillo
 Daniela Alvarado as Melissa Rodríguez
 Angélica Herrera as Maricarmen Pérez
 Héctor Moreno as Manuel Antonio Arismendi
 Roque Valero as Máximo Palmero
 Cecilia Villarreal as María Cristina de Aristiguieta
 Esperanza Magaz as Fátima Pérez
 Raúl Xiqués as Professor Emiliano Ortega
 Fernando Flores as Director Perfecto Aguirre
 Juan Manuel Montesinos as José Ramón Gutiérrez
 Rodolfo Drago as Ernesto Rodríguez
 Esther Orjuela as Ana Cecilia
 Martha Pabón as Olga
 Amilcar Rivero as Tiburcio Pérez
 Luis Alberto de Mozos as Reinaldo Aristiguieta
 Mimi Sills as Profesora Irene Ortiz

References

External links 
 

1997 telenovelas
Venevisión telenovelas
Venezuelan telenovelas
1997 Venezuelan television series debuts
1998 Venezuelan television series endings
Spanish-language telenovelas
Television series about teenagers
Television shows set in Venezuela